Tunkás is a town and the municipal seat of the Tunkás Municipality, Yucatán in Mexico. As of 2010, the town has a population of 2,828.

Demographics

Climate

References

Populated places in Yucatán
Municipality seats in Yucatán